Dichlorotetrakis(pyridine)rhodium(III) chloride is the chloride salt of the coordination complex with the formula [RhCl2(pyridine)4]+.  Various hydrates are known, but all are yellow solids. The tetrahydrate initially crystallizes from water. The tetrahydrate converts to the monohydrate upon vacuum drying at 100 °C.

The hydrates of [RhCl2(pyridine)4]Cl are prepared by heating rhodium trichloride with an excess of pyridine in the presence of a catalytic amount of a reductant.

Related complexes
The molecular complex RhCl3(pyridine)3 is an intermediate in the synthesis of [RhCl2(pyridine)4]Cl.

References

Rhodium(III) compounds
Pyridine complexes
Chloro complexes